Bruno of Würzburg (c. 1005 – 27 May 1045), also known as Bruno of Carinthia, was imperial chancellor of Italy from 1027 to 1034 for Conrad II, Holy Roman Emperor, to whom he was related, and from 1034 until his death prince-bishop of Würzburg.

Origin and Imperial politics
Bruno was the son of Conrad I, Duke of Carinthia, and Matilda of Swabia, and thus a cousin of the Salian Emperor Conrad II. He courted Agnes of Poitou on behalf of Conrad's son and successor Emperor Henry III. Bruno laid the corner-stone of Würzburg Cathedral, and in 1042 dedicated the Abbey of St. Burchard, rebuilt by Abbot Willemund.

He also accompanied Henry on his second Hungarian Campaign, during which Bruno died in an accident at Persenbeug on the Danube in the present Lower Austria.

Death
The retinue of Henry III had stopped at the residence of Countess Richlinde of Ebersberg, who was faced with the task of distributing the estate of her recently deceased husband Count Adalbero II of Ebersberg. During a great banquet given by the countess a load-bearing pillar supporting the banqueting hall broke, causing the entire floor to collapse. The king was only slightly hurt but the countess, Bishop Bruno and Abbot Altmann of Ebersberg Abbey were so badly injured that they did not survive more than a few days. The Annals of Niederaltaich add a legend to the story: before the feast, at the Strudengau on the Danube near Grein, the devil was supposed to have appeared to the bishop and threatened him already, but the bishop was able to repel him. Bruno's body was returned to his residence in Würzburg.

He was succeeded by his nephew, Adalbero of Würzburg.

Burial and cultus
Many cathedrals were built in that period, and from 1040 Bruno began the construction of Würzburg Cathedral. The consecration of the crypt on 16 June 1045 was combined with his burial. Bruno was not formally canonized by the Roman Catholic Church, but is nevertheless revered as a saint. His feast day is May 17th (not the 27th, see Roman Martyrology).

Bruno wrote a well-known commentary on the Psalms, to which he appended an analysis of ten Biblical hymns, consisting of extracts from the writings of the Church Fathers.

References

Sources
 Peter Kolb and Ernst-Günther Krenig (eds.), 1989: Unterfränkische Geschichte, pp. 229–232. Würzburg

External links 

 
 
 Psalterium beati Brunonis episcopi herbipolensis (Nürnberg 1497 and Lipsiae 1533), digitised by www.digitale-sammlungen.de
 Inkunabel Psalterium beati Brunonis episcopi herbipolensis (Anton Koberger, Nürnberg 1497), digitised by the Universidad de los Andes
 http://www.santiebeati.it/dettaglio/54850
 
 
 Inkunabel Psalterium beati Brunonis episcopi herbipolensis (Anton Koberger, Nuremberg, 1497), digitalised by the University of the Andes

Roman Catholic bishops of Würzburg
Salian dynasty
German Roman Catholic saints
11th-century German bishops
1045 deaths
11th-century Christian saints
Year of birth unknown